Black history refers to:

History of Africa
History of the African diaspora, particularly:
African-American history, for the United States
History of Afro-Arab peoples
Afro-Brazilian history
History of Black British people
History of Black Canadians
Afro-Caribbean history
History of Afro-Latin Americans

See also
Black History for Action, a lecture and discussion forum in the UK
Black History Month, celebrated in February in North America and October in Great Britain